Deovolente is an unincorporated community located in Humphreys County, Mississippi.

History
The name Deovolante comes from the Latin phrase "Deo volente", which means God willing. The community was founded by African-Americans.

The Deovolante Museum, which contains artifacts from the communities history, is housed in a room at O.M. McNair Upper Elementary School in Belzoni.

A post office operated under the name Deovolante from 1878 to 1928.

Prior to the creation of Humphreys County, Deovolante was located in Washington County.

Notable person
 Alyce Clarke, member of the Mississippi House of Representatives

References

Unincorporated communities in Humphreys County, Mississippi
Unincorporated communities in Mississippi